The United Counties of Leeds and Grenville, commonly known as Leeds and Grenville, is a county in Ontario, Canada, in the Eastern Ontario subregion of Southern Ontario. It fronts on the Saint Lawrence River and the international boundary between Canada and the United States, opposite of the State of New York. The county seat is Brockville. The county was formed by the union of the historical counties of Leeds and Grenville in 1850.

Subdivisions
There are 10 municipalities in Leeds and Grenville (in order of population):
 Municipality of North Grenville (part of Grenville sub-region)
 Township of Rideau Lakes (part of Leeds sub-region)
 Township of Elizabethtown-Kitley (part of Leeds sub-region)
 Township of Leeds and the Thousand Islands (part of Leeds sub-region)
 Township of Augusta (part of Grenville sub-region)
 Township of Edwardsburgh/Cardinal (part of Grenville sub-region)
 Village of Merrickville–Wolford (part of Grenville sub-region)
 Township of Athens (part of Leeds sub-region)
 Township of Front of Yonge (part of Leeds sub-region)
 Village of Westport (part of Leeds sub-region)

The city of Brockville and towns of Gananoque and Prescott are part of the Leeds and Grenville census division but are independent of the county.

Historical townships
Leeds County
Bastard (now part of Rideau Lakes)
Elizabethtown (now part of Elizabethtown-Kitley)
Front of Escott (now part of Leeds and the Thousand Islands)
Front of Leeds and Lansdowne (now part of Leeds and the Thousand Islands)
Front of Yonge (still exists)
Kitley (now part of Elizabethtown-Kitley)
North Crosby (now part of Rideau Lakes)
Rear of Escott (now part of Athens)
Rear of Leeds and Lansdowne (now part of Leeds and the Thousand Islands)
Rear of Yonge (now part of Athens)
South Burgess (now part of Rideau Lakes)
South Crosby (now part of Rideau Lakes)
South Elmsley (now part of Rideau Lakes)
Grenville County
Augusta (still exists)
Edwardsburgh (still exists as part of Edwardsburgh/Cardinal)
Oxford (now part of North Grenville)
South Gower (now part of North Grenville)
Smiths Falls (south end of town, while most of Smiths Falls is located in Lanark County)
Wolford (still exists as part of Merrickville-Wolford)

Demographics

Historic populations:
 Population in 2001: 96,606
 Population in 1996: 96,284

County courthouse

William Buell granted the land for construction of the Courthouse. It is set atop a hill rising from the Saint Lawrence River. A broad boulevard extends to the main street. The Brockville Courthouse, one of the oldest in Ontario, was erected in 1842. The original plan had been to build a courthouse in the township of Johnstown but the land there was too swampy for construction. Instead, the Courthouse was built in the township of Elizabethtown.

The figure of Justice, a blind-folded woman holding the scales of justice, was carved by master carpenter William Holmes in 1844. This statue was named "Sally Grant" by Paul Glasford, the chair of the building committee, in honour of the woman who posed as the model.  It was erected in 1845. However, the statue was damaged by Hurricane Hazel and by 1956, the statue was rotting. The original statue is on display at the Westport museum. A replica carved by Robert Kerr of Smiths Falls was placed atop the Courthouse in 1982.

Transportation

Major highways

Notes
The town of Smiths Falls is mostly located in Lanark County, while parts of the southern areas of the town is in the township of Rideau Lakes in the United Counties of Leeds and Grenville.

See also
 List of municipalities in Ontario
 List of townships in Ontario
 Union, Leeds and Grenville United Counties, Ontario
 List of secondary schools in Ontario#Leeds and Grenville United Counties

References

External links

 
United counties in Ontario